Bhadrapur, Dharwad is a village in Dharwad district of Karnataka, India.

Demographics 
As of the 2011 Census of India there were 714 households in Bhadrapur and a total population of 3,524 consisting of 1,787 males and 1,737 females. There were 444 children ages 0-6.

References

Villages in Dharwad district